Nishchaiy is a 1992 Indian Hindi-language film directed by Esmayeel Shroff and released in 1992. The film stars Vinod Khanna, Salman Khan, Karisma Kapoor.

Plot
Ravi Yadav is the servant of Manohar Singh. He has a younger brother, Rohan Yadav, whom he wishes to see as a successful and good lawyer. Manohar's wife starts to teach Ravi English so he can get a good job when he goes to Mumbai and that he can afford Rohan's school and college expenses, but Manohar feels insecure and plans to jail Ravi. Ravi is falsely accused of raping his lover, Parvati, and sentenced to 12 years in prison because the real rapist killed Parvati and then told the court that Ravi has raped her. Manohar's wife Renuka assures Ravi that she will help Rohan in becoming a lawyer.

12 years later, when Ravi comes out of prison, Rohan's whereabouts are unknown. Rohan, in the meantime, has been adopted by famous lawyer Gujral, and his wife Yashoda, and is now known as Vasudev Gujral, a lawyer by profession. Vasudev falls in love with Payal Singh, who happens to be Manohar's daughter. Ravi finds out that Renuka is alive, but her memory is diminished after Manohar tried to kill her. Manohar is unaware of Renuka being alive. He starts medical treatment for Renuka. To earn the needed money, he accepts a contract to kill Vasudev Gujral, because he is told that Vasu has raped and then killed a woman and by killing Vasu he is helping the women's mother in revenge, little knowing that he is about to kill his own innocent long-separated brother.

When he enters Vasudev's room he sees a picture and gets to know that Vasu is Rohan. He returns, but Vasu catches him and starts beating him, and Ravi is arrested. In the police station, Renuka comes rushing because her memory has returned. Everyone gets to know about what happened and Payal is reunited with her mother, whom she was told had died. Payal goes to her house to confront her father, Manohar. Manohar traps her own daughter. Then comes some action. Ravi is shot by Manohar, Renuka wants to kill Manohar, but Ravi who is taking his last breaths tells her not to. Ravi dies and the story ends.

Cast
Vinod Khanna as Ravi Yadav
Salman Khan as Rohan Yadav / Advocate Vasudev Gujral 
Karishma Kapoor as Payal Singh
Moushumi Chatterjee as Renuka Singh
Saeed Jaffrey as Advocate Suryakant Gujral
Reema Lagoo as Yashoda Gujral
Roopa Ganguly as Vidya
Sudha Chandran as Judy Martin
Sonu Walia as Parvati "Paro"
Rajeev Verma as Manohar Singh
Goga Kapoor as Ruffian
Avtar Gill as Dheerendra Thakur
Mahesh Anand as Joseph Lobo
Javed Khan as Parvati's Brother-in-law
Ramesh Deo as Ravi's Lawyer
Kamaldeep as Judge
Kishore Bhanushali as Prashant
Krishan Dhawan	as Bal Gopal
Prem Sagar as Police Officer Vinayak

Music 

The soundtrack of the film contains 6 songs. The music was composed by O. P. Nayyar and lyrics written by Qamar Jalalabadi.

When the Venus company distributed the music for the film they were excited for O.P. Nayyar making a return to composing soundtracks for Hindi films.  However, when the Venus bosses ended up hearing the songs, they decided they would no longer buy a film that O. P. Nayyar composed the soundtrack for. They felt the music was very dated and stopped all production of the soundtrack, after the initial release.

References

External links

1992 films
1990s Hindi-language films
Films scored by O. P. Nayyar